Hathcock is a surname.

Notable people with the surname include:

Carlos Hathcock, former United States Marine Corps (USMC) sniper with a service record of 93 confirmed kills
Dave Hathcock, former American football defensive back in the National Football League for the Green Bay Packers and the New York Giants
Jessie Scott Hathcock, African American humanitarian, educator, and civil rights leader

See also
 Hatchcock's sign
 Heathcock (disambiguation)